The 2015–16 Texas A&M–Corpus Christi Islanders women's basketball team represented Texas A&M University–Corpus Christi in the 2015–16 NCAA Division I women's basketball season. The Islanders were led by fourth year head coach Royce Chadwick. They played their home games at the American Bank Center and the Dugan Wellness Center and were members of the Southland Conference. They finished the season 9–20, 6–12 in Southland play to finish in tenth place. They failed to qualify for the Southland women's tournament.

Media
Video streaming of all non-televised home games and audio for all road games is available at GoIslanders.com.

Roster

Schedule and Results

|-
!colspan=9 style="background:#0067C5; color:#FFFFFF;"| Exhibition

|-
!colspan=9 style="background:#0067C5; color:#FFFFFF;"| Non-conference regular season

|-
!colspan=9 style="background:#0067C5; color:#FFFFFF;"| Southland regular season

See also
2015–16 Texas A&M–Corpus Christi Islanders men's basketball team

References

Texas A&M–Corpus Christi Islanders women's basketball seasons
Texas AandM-Corpus Christi
Texas AandM-Corpus Christi Islanders basketball
Texas AandM-Corpus Christi Islanders basketball